Web of Spider-Man is the name of two different monthly comic book series starring Spider-Man that have been published by Marvel Comics since 1985, the first volume of which ran for 129 issues between 1985 and 1995, and the second of which ran for 12 issues between 2009 and 2010.

Publication history

Volume 1
The first volume of Web of Spider-Man published by Marvel Comics for 129 issues, cover dated from April 1985 to October 1995. It replaced Marvel Team-Up as the third major Spider-Man title of the time. Web of Spider-Man Annual ran for ten issues from 1985 to 1994.
 
The series was launched with an April 1985 cover dated issue by writer Louise Simonson and penciller Greg LaRocque and featured the return of Spider-Man's alien black costume, which attempted to rebond with Peter Parker. Peter managed to rid himself of the costume again using church bells and the alien was presumed to have died after that.  The first issue featured a cover painting by artist Charles Vess.

In issue #18 (September 1986), Peter Parker is pushed in front of an oncoming train. He thinks to himself that this should not have happened, as his spider-sense would have warned him of the danger. Writer David Michelinie has said that he wrote this as the first "teaser" appearance of the character Venom, whom he was planning to introduce at a later date. Venom is an amalgam of reporter Eddie Brock and the alien costume. The costume could nullify Spider-Man's spider-sense, and this was the first clue of a puzzle that Michelinie was planning to weave to introduce Venom. 

Web of Spider-Man Annual #2 (1986) featured stories drawn by Arthur Adams and Mike Mignola.  A followup to the Spider-Man vs. Wolverine one-shot appeared in issue #29. The "Kraven's Last Hunt" storyline by writer J.M. DeMatteis and artists Mike Zeck and Bob McLeod began in issue #31 (October 1987).

The "Tribute-to-Teen-Agers" story in issue #35 saw the debut of the creative team of writer Gerry Conway and artist Alex Saviuk. Web of Spider-Man #50 featured guest-appearances by several minor Marvel super-heroes such as the Puma, the Prowler, and Rocket Racer.  A hologram on the cover of issue #90 (July 1992) marked the 30th anniversary of Spider-Man's first appearance. A four-part crossover with Ghost Rider/Blaze: Spirits of Vengeance began in issue #95(December 1992). Spider-Man donned "Spider-Armor" in issue #100's story by Terry Kavanagh and Alex Saviuk.

The "Clone Saga" storyline began in issue #117 (October 1994) and Ben Reilly became the Scarlet Spider in the next issue.

After issue #129 in October 1995, the title was renamed Web of Scarlet Spider and started again at #1. After four issues, the series was cancelled to make way for the new The Sensational Spider-Man title.

Volume 2
In December 2009, Web of Spider-Man volume 2 debuted as a new anthology title replacing Amazing Spider-Man Family, with the initial story written by J. M. DeMatteis focusing on Kaine. The title also served as the new home for Spider-Girl, who was written by Tom DeFalco and illustrated by Ron Frenz, the character having first appeared on Marvel.com as The Spectacular Spider-Girl. The stories feature characters tied to "The Gauntlet" storyline, such as Electro, the Rhino, the Lizard, and many more from Spider-Man's colorful rogues gallery, each titled "Gauntlet: Origins, ...". The series ended in November 2010 with issue #12.

Collected editions
 Essential Web of Spider-Man
 Vol. 1 collects Web of Spider-Man #1–18 and Annual #1–2, 528 pages, September 2011,  
 Vol. 2 collects Web of Spider-Man#19–32 and Annual #3, 480 pages, July 2012,  
 Spider-Man: Birth of Venom includes Web of Spider-Man #1, 352 pages, April 2007, 
 Secret Wars II Omnibus includes Web of Spider-Man #6, 1184 pages, May 2009,   
 Spider-Man Fearful Symmetry: Kraven's Last Hunt includes Web of Spider-Man #31–32, 164 pages, December 1991,  
 Spider-Man's Greatest Villains includes Web of Spider-Man #38, 176 pages, December 1995,  
 Evolutionary War Omnibus includes Web of Spider-Man Annual #4, 472 pages, September 2011,  
 Atlantis Attacks Omnibus  includes Web of Spider-Man Annual #5, 552 pages, March 2011,  
 X-Men: Inferno Omnibus  includes Web of Spider-Man #47-48, 1240 pages, March 2021,  
 Spider-Man: The Cosmic Adventures includes Web of Spider-Man #59–61, 192 pages, March 1993,  
 Acts of Vengeance Omnibus includes Web of Spider-Man #64–65, 744 pages, March 2011,  
 Spider-Man and New Warriors: Hero Killers includes Web of Spider-Man Annual #8, 232 pages, March 2012,  
 Spirits of Venom includes Web of Spider-Man #95–96, 48 pages, December 1993,  
 Spider-Man: Maximum Carnage includes Web of Spider-Man #101–103, 336 pages, December 2006,  
 Spider-Man: The Complete Clone Saga Epic 
 Book 1 includes Web of Spider-Man #117–119, 424 pages, April 2010,  
 Book 2 includes Web of Spider-Man #120–122, 480 pages, June 2010,  
 Book 3 includes Web of Spider-Man #123–124, 464 pages, September 2010,  
 Book 4 includes Web of Spider-Man #125–127, 480 pages, December 2010,  
 Book 5 includes Web of Spider-Man #128–129, 472 pages, February 2011,  
 The Amazing Spider-Man: Return of the Black Cat includes Web of Spider-Man vol. 2 #1, 168 pages, June 2010, 
 Spider-Man: New York Stories includes back-up stories from Web of Spider-Man vol. 2 #1, 3–5, 7–11, 152 pages, May 2011,  
 The Amazing Spider-Man: The Gauntlet 
 Vol. 1 – Electro & Sandman includes Web of Spider-Man vol. 2 #2, 176 pages, March 2010,  
 Vol. 2 – Rhino & Mysterio includes Web of Spider-Man vol. 2 #3–4, 160 pages, April 2010,  
 Vol. 3 – Vulture & Morbius includes Web of Spider-Man vol. 2 #2 and #6, 136 pages, June 2010,  
 Vol. 5 – The Lizard includes Web of Spider-Man vol. 2 #6, 128 pages, September 2010,  
 Spider-Man: Grim Hunt includes Web of Spider-Man vol. 2 #7, 192 pages, March 2011,  
 Spider-Man: The Extremist includes Web of Spider-Man vol. 2 #8–12, 144 pages, May 2011,

References

External links
 Web of Spider-Man at the Unofficial Handbook of Marvel Comics Creators

1985 comics debuts
1995 comics endings
2009 comics debuts
2010 comics endings
Comics by Fabian Nicieza
Comics by John Byrne (comics)
Comics by Kurt Busiek
Comics by Louise Simonson
Comics by Mike Mignola
Comics by Peter David
Comics by Steve Gerber
Web of Spider-man